Hellfire: The Story of Australia, Japan and the Prisoners of War is a history book written by Australian journalist and author Cameron Forbes published by Macmillan Publishers in 2005. It tells the stories of Australian prisoners of war of the Japanese during the Second World War, with particular focus on the Burma Railway.

Publication
 Total pages: 559.

References

History books about World War II
Books about Japan
Australian prisoners of war
2005 non-fiction books
Macmillan Publishers books